The following is List of Universities and Colleges in Gansu.

Public
Lanzhou University, founded 1909, Double First Class University Plan
Northwest University for Nationalities
Northwest Normal University, founded 1902
Lanzhou University of Technology, founded 1919
Lanzhou Jiaotong University, founded 1958
Gansu Agricultural University, founded 1958
Gansu University of Traditional Chinese Medicine
Lanzhou University of Finance and Economics
Gansu Political Science and Law Institute
Tianshui Normal Institute (Tianshui)
Hexi Institute (Zhangye)
Longdong College (Qingyang)
Gansu Institute of Administration
Lanzhou Institute of Technology (）

References
List of Chinese Higher Education Institutions — Ministry of Education
List of Chinese universities, including official links
Gansu Institutions Admitting International Students

 
Gansu